Murchison is a town in the Tasman Region of the South Island of New Zealand. It is near the western end of the "Four Rivers Plain", at the confluence of the Buller River and the Matakitaki River. The other two rivers are the Mangles River, and the Matiri River.
It is a rural service town for the surrounding mixed farming district, approximately halfway between Westport and Nelson. Murchison was named after the Scottish geologist Roderick Murchison, one of the founders of the Royal Geographical Society.

History
During the period 1853 to 1876, the area that became Murchison was administered as part of Nelson Province. The future settlement of Murchison did not come into being until gold was discovered in the area, and the town was surveyed in 1865, under the name Hampden.

With the Abolition of Provinces Act 1876, the new Murchison County was created, taking over administration of its area in January 1877, with Hampden as the county's headquarters. The town changed its name to Murchison in 1882, taking its name from the county, to avoid confusion with another South Island town with the same name.

The world's earliest non-military suicide attack is believed to have occurred in Murchison on 14 July 1905. A long-standing dispute between two farmers resulted in a court case, and the defendant (Joseph Sewell) had sticks of gelignite strapped to his body. When Sewell excitedly shouted during the court sitting, "I'll blow the devil to hell, and I have enough dynamite to do just that", he was ushered out of the building. Sewell detonated the charge when a police officer tried to arrest him on the street, and his body was blown to pieces; no one else died from the explosion.

Murchison was the epicentre of the 1929 Murchison earthquake, which resulted in the deaths of 17 people, making it the third deadliest earthquake in New Zealand's recorded history.

Murchison County existed until the 1989 local government reforms, when the Tasman District was formed through the amalgamation of the Murchison County, Golden Bay County, Waimea County and Richmond Borough administrative areas. Since that time, the urban area of Murchison is administered by the Tasman District council, from the district seat of Richmond.

Demographics

Murchison
It is part of the wider Murchison-Nelson Lakes statistical area, which covers /

Murchison, comprising the SA1 statistical areas of 7022661–7022664, had a population of 606 at the 2018 New Zealand census, an increase of 186 people (44.3%) since the 2013 census, and an increase of 270 people (80.4%) since the 2006 census. There were 222 households. There were 306 males and 294 females, giving a sex ratio of 1.04 males per female, with 111 people (18.3%) aged under 15 years, 72 (11.9%) aged 15 to 29, 324 (53.5%) aged 30 to 64, and 90 (14.9%) aged 65 or older.

Ethnicities were 96.0% European/Pākehā, 5.0% Māori, 0.5% Pacific peoples, 2.5% Asian, and 1.0% other ethnicities (totals add to more than 100% since people could identify with multiple ethnicities).

Although some people objected to giving their religion, 58.9% had no religion, 27.7% were Christian, 1.0% were Buddhist and 1.5% had other religions.

Of those at least 15 years old, 126 (25.5%) people had a bachelor or higher degree, and 57 (11.5%) people had no formal qualifications. The employment status of those at least 15 was that 264 (53.3%) people were employed full-time, 75 (15.2%) were part-time, and 9 (1.8%) were unemployed.

Murchison-Nelson Lakes statistical area

Murchison-Nelson Lakes had a population of 1,290 at the 2018 New Zealand census, an increase of 108 people (9.1%) since the 2013 census, and an increase of 114 people (9.7%) since the 2006 census. There were 564 households. There were 645 males and 642 females, giving a sex ratio of 1.0 males per female. The median age was 47.7 years (compared with 37.4 years nationally), with 210 people (16.3%) aged under 15 years, 156 (12.1%) aged 15 to 29, 672 (52.1%) aged 30 to 64, and 252 (19.5%) aged 65 or older.

Ethnicities were 94.0% European/Pākehā, 8.6% Māori, 0.9% Pacific peoples, 2.3% Asian, and 2.8% other ethnicities (totals add to more than 100% since people could identify with multiple ethnicities).

The proportion of people born overseas was 13.7%, compared with 27.1% nationally.

Although some people objected to giving their religion, 60.0% had no religion, 27.4% were Christian, 0.2% were Hindu, 0.5% were Buddhist and 2.1% had other religions.

Of those at least 15 years old, 153 (14.2%) people had a bachelor or higher degree, and 264 (24.4%) people had no formal qualifications. The median income was $28,900, compared with $31,800 nationally. The employment status of those at least 15 was that 585 (54.2%) people were employed full-time, 201 (18.6%) were part-time, and 15 (1.4%) were unemployed.

Attractions

Whitewater sports are a popular tourist attraction in Murchison. Nearby rivers include the Gowan River, Mangles River, Matiri River, Glenroy River, Matakitaki River, Maruia River, and the Buller. These rivers vary from Class 2 to 4 whitewater. Kahurangi and Nelson Lakes National Parks are nearby, as well as Lake Matiri and Mount Owen.

Notable buildings

Hodgsons of Murchison 

Hodgsons has been the local store in Murchison for over 100 years. It is listed as a historic place category 2 by Heritage New Zealand. It was damaged significantly by the 1929 Murchison earthquake.

Murchison Museum 

The Murchison Museum focuses on the effects of the 1929 Murchison Earthquake on the township. it is located at 60 Fairfax Street.

St Paul's Anglican church 

St Paul's was built in a gothic style on Fairfax Street in 1905. It was designed by Nelson architect David Greg and built by John Downie. It was listed as a category two historic place in 2009.

Transport and infrastructure 
The town is located on the main route connecting Nelson and Marlborough with the West Coast, and one of two main routes connecting Nelson with Christchurch. After the 2016 Kaikōura earthquake, which closed State Highway 1 and Main North Line through Kaikōura for 13 months, all traffic north of Christchurch to Nelson, Blenheim, Picton and onwards to the North Island was diverted via Murchison. The resulting detour resulted in traffic volumes through the town more than doubling, with accommodation in the town at capacity and food outlets struggling to cope with the influx. Murchison has one petrol station (Mobil) and one electric vehicle charging station.

Network Tasman owns and operates the electricity distribution network in Murchison. Electricity is fed from Transpower's national grid at its Murchison substation, on Matiri Valley Road northeast of the town.

The Tasman District Council operates reticulated fresh water, stormwater and wastewater systems in Murchison. Fresh water is sourced from two bores west of the town centre, close to the Matakitaki River.

Education 

Notable people 

 Annette King, New Zealand politician and diplomat

References

Populated places in the Tasman District